The first government of Mohamed Ould Bilal was the 16th government of the Islamic Republic of Mauritania, in office between 8 August 2020 and 29 March 2022. It was a coalition between the Union for the Republic and the Union for Democracy and Progress, whose leader Naha Mint Mouknass was the only member representing the party.

Background
The government was formed after Prime Minister Ismail Ould Bedde Ould Cheikh Sidiya resigned with his government on 6 August 2020 amid an investigation into alleged corruption during the government of the previous President Mohamed Ould Abdel Aziz, with several current ministers were questioned about suspected graft that occurred on their watch while serving in senior positions during Abdel Aziz's rule. Mohamed Ould Bilal, who previously headed several state agencies, was appointed PM on the same day.

When the government was formed on 9 August 2020, the Minister Secretary-General of the Presidency of the Republic confirmed that the reshuffle was done due to the findings done by the parliamentary commission that was investigating corruption during Ould Abdel Aziz's rule, since the names of certain members of the resigning government had been cited in the report of the parliamentary committee. Bokar Soko also said that the government respected the presumption of innocence but that they would let the ministers defend it themselves and wouldn't hesitate to reincorporate them to the government if their innoncency was proven.

Cabinet changes
Ould Bilal's first government saw a reshuffle:
 On 26 May 2021, a presidential decree was published announcing changes in several ministries, including five new ministers. The changes included the transformation of several ministries.

Ministers
The list of members was announced by the Minister Secretary-General of the Presidency of the Republic on 9 August, taking position immediately.

Footnotes

References

Mauritania
2020 establishments
2022 disestablishments